is a highly syncretic religion, a body of ascetic practices that originated in the Nara Period of Japan having evolved during the 7th century from an amalgamation of beliefs, philosophies, doctrines and ritual systems drawn from local folk-religious practices, Shinto mountain worship and Buddhism. The final purpose of Shugendō is for practitioners to find supernatural power and save themselves and the masses by conducting religious training while treading through steep mountain ranges. The mountains where shugenja is practiced are all over Japan, and include various mountains of the Ōmine mountain range such as Mount Hakkyō and Mount Ōmine. 

The Shugendō worldview includes a large pantheon of deities (which include Buddhist and Shinto figures). Some of the most important figures are the tantric Buddhist figures of Fudō Myōō and Dainichi Nyorai.

History 
Shugendō evolved during the seventh century from an amalgamation of beliefs, philosophies, doctrines and ritual systems drawn from local folk-religious practices, Shinto mountain worship and Buddhism. The seventh-century ascetic and mystic En no Gyōja is widely considered as the patriarch of Shugendō, having first organized Shugendō as a doctrine. Shugendō literally means "the path of training and testing" or "the way to spiritual power through discipline." Shugendō practitioners are also said to be descendants of the Kōya Hijiri monks of the eighth and ninth centuries.

From the ninth century, elements of Vajrayana Buddhism such as Shingon and Tendai Buddhism were taken into Shugendō and it developed further. In the Heian period, it became very popular among the nobles living in Kyoto to visit Kumano Sanzan (three major shrines, Kumano Hongū Taisha, Kumano Hayatama Taisha and Kumano Nachi Taisha), which was the common holy place of Shugendō, Shinto and Buddhism.

The Meiji government, which erected a barrier between Shinto and Buddhism, ruled that Shugendō was unacceptable because of its amalgamation of the two religions, and officially forbade it in 1872. With the advent of religious freedom in Japan after World War II, Shugendō was revived.

In 1907, Yoshitaro Shibasaki and his team successfully climbed Mount Tsurugi, which was regarded as the last unclimbed mountain in Japan. However, they found a metal cane decoration and a sword on the top of the mountain, and it turned out that someone had reached the top before them. A later scientific investigation revealed that the metal cane decoration and sword dated from the late Nara period to the early Heian period and that shugenja had climbed Mount Tsurugi more than 1,000 years ago.

The Ōmine mountain range, which stretches 100 km from north to south and connects Yoshino and Kumano, was historically the biggest practice place of Shugendō. The highest peak of the Ōmine mountain range is Mount Hakkyō at an altitude of 1915 m, and there are 75 places for ascetic practices along the mountain trail, and Ōminesan-ji Temple at the top of Mount Ōmine at an altitude of 1719 m is considered to be the highest sacred site of Shugendō. At present, the Ōmine mountain range is designated as a  UNESCO World Heritage Site "Sacred Sites and Pilgrimage Routes in the Kii Mountain Range" and Yoshino-Kumano National Park.

In modern times, Shugendō is practiced mainly through Tendai and Shingon temples. Some temples include Kimpusen-ji in Yoshino (Tendai), Ideha Shrine in the Three Mountains of Dewa and Daigo-ji in Kyoto (Shingon).

Practices 
According to Miyake Hitoshi, Shugendō rituals include "festivals, fortunetelling, divination, prayers and incantations, exorcism, spells, charms and so forth." Hitoshi describes the main worldview which informs Shugendo praxis as one which:

assumes the existence of at least two realms of existence, that of the daily lives of human beings, and a separate, supernatural spiritual realm behind, and which controls that of the daily lives of human beings. The mountains are seen either as a sacred space which is part of both of these worlds, or is seen to actually be a part of the spiritual world. The altar space during the fire ceremony, or the area of a matsuri, is also considered to be this kind of sacred space. 

The tantric Buddhist deity Fudō Myōō (Sanskrit: Acala, "Immovable") plays a central role in the Shugendo cosmology practice. Another important Buddha is Dainichi Nyorai (大日如来，Mahavairocana). The Shugendo pantheon also includes numerous other Buddhist, Shinto and local religious figures. 

The most important Shugendō practices are "practices in the mountains" (nyūbu shugyō, 入峰修行). In Shugendō, sacred mountains are seen as a supernatural home of numerous deities and as a symbol of the entire universe. According to Hitoshi, "the central element which forms both of these rituals is the symbolic action exhibited in a state of identification with the central deity Fudō Myōō." The main source of the shugenja's spiritual power generally understood to be Fudō Myōō and a shugenja gains the ability to use Fudō Myōō's power through mountain practices.

There are three main forms of mountain practice according to Miyake Hitoshi:

 "Entering the mountain to make offerings of flowers, read or bury sutras, and so forth, in honor of various buddhas or other deities, based on the belief that the mountain is a sacred area like a mandala."
 "Entering the mountain for a certain period of time," a kind of mountain retreat during which yamabushi do various ascetic practices and receive esoteric knowledge and initiations.
 The most severe and advanced nyūbu is the wintertime retreat in the mountains. This is said to confer special spiritual powers.

Shugendō esoteric initiations are called shōkanjō (正灌頂) and are unique to Shugendō tradition (but are based on Vajrayana Buddhist abhiseka ceremonies). 

Another important Shugendō practice is the demonstration of magical and spiritual powers (genjutsu, 験 術). Such displays may include fire walking, walking on swords, and entering boiling water.

Yet another important religious practice in Shugendō is various rites or rituals of worship (kuyōhō, 供養法) which includes making offerings to Shugendō deities (such as Fudō Myōō and Zaō Gongen) as well as the chanting of sutras.

Shugendō practitioners also take part in Shinto festivals (matsuri, 祭) and make offerings to kami.

Other practices which are part of Shugendō include the following:

 Fortunetelling and divination (bokusen)
 obtaining oracles through mediums (fujutsu)
 obtaining oracles through mediums that have been possessed by a deity (yori kitō, 憑祈禱)
 Fire ceremonies for averting misfortunes (sokusai goma), usually focused around Fudō Myōō
 Using incantations (kaji) for a specific purpose
 Spells and charms (fuju, majinai), used for healing, childbirth, protection and so on. These may be inscribed on amulets.
 Exorcism (tsukimono otoshi) for healing purposes
Shugendo ritualists also practice different rituals, prayers and ceremonies associated with particular deities (shosonbō, 諸尊法) including the buddhas Yakushi and Amida, the bodhisattvas Monju, Kokuzo and Kannon as well as Indian deities like Benzai-ten and Japanese Kami like Inari, and Daikoku.

Gallery

See also 
 Kaihōgyō
 Mikkyō
 Milarepa
 Mount Hatsuka
 Mount Hiei
 Mount Ōfuna
 Mount Ōmine
 Onmyōdō
 Sokushinbutsu

Citations

General and cited references

External links 

 A Look at Japanese Ascetic Practice
 Head Temple Takao-san Yakuo-in Central Shugendo Training Center in Kanto
 天台寺門宗｜修験道
 Shugen: The Autumn Peak of Haguro Shugendo
 Mount Fuji and Shugendo
 Shugendo article in Buddhism & Shinto in Japan: A-to-Z Photo Dictionary of Japanese Religious Sculpture & Art
Shugendo - History of Japan Database

 
Religion in Japan
Religious syncretism in Japan
Shinbutsu shūgō
Vajrayana
Eastern esotericism
Japanese words and phrases